Hoya bicolensis is an endemic species of porcelainflower or wax plant found in the Philippines, an Asclepiad species of flowering plant in the dogbane family Apocynaceae described in 2012 by Kloppenburg, Siar & Cajano. Hoya bicolensis belongs to the genus Hoya.

Etymology
The specific epithet in the scientific name, bicolensis was named after the Bicol region, a region at the southernmost tip of Luzon island, the place where the species was collected.

References

bicolensis
Endemic flora of the Philippines
bicolensis